George William Albert Ivory (21 April 1910 – q1 1992) was an English professional footballer who played as an inside forward in the Football League for Millwall and York City, in non-League football for Sheppey United and Sittingbourne and was on the books of Tottenham Hotspur without making a league appearance.

References

1910 births
People from Sittingbourne
1992 deaths
English footballers
Association football forwards
Sheppey United F.C. players
Millwall F.C. players
York City F.C. players
Tottenham Hotspur F.C. players
Sittingbourne F.C. players
English Football League players